Mohammed Awaji (born 22 October 1994) is a Saudi Arabian football player who plays as a goalkeeper.

External links
 

Living people
1994 births
Association football goalkeepers
Saudi Arabian footballers
Saudi Arabia youth international footballers
Al-Shabab FC (Riyadh) players
Al-Adalah FC players
Al-Tai FC players
Sportspeople from Riyadh
Saudi Professional League players
Saudi First Division League players
Footballers at the 2014 Asian Games
Asian Games competitors for Saudi Arabia
20th-century Saudi Arabian people
21st-century Saudi Arabian people